Environmental Biology of Fishes is a peer-reviewed scientific journal focusing on all aspects of fish and fish-related biology, and the links to their environment. The journal is published by Springer Science+Business Media and was established in 1976. The current editor-in-chief is  Margaret F. Docker (University of Manitoba).

Abstracting and indexing
The journal is abstracted and indexed in the following databases:

According to the Journal Citation Reports, the journal has a 2020 impact factor of 1.844.

References

External links

Ichthyology journals
Publications established in 1976
Springer Science+Business Media academic journals
Quarterly journals
English-language journals